Radio Jadran is a radio station in Montenegro. Its headquarters are in Herceg Novi.
The founders of radio Jadran are Montenegrin water polo players Boris Zloković and Predrag Jokić

Schedule:

8:00 am   Jadranov Đir - The morning program

12:30 pm   Šugiganje    - Talk Show

2:30 pm    Spektar      - News from Herceg Novi, Kotor, Tivat, Budva

Vijesti      - World news

Frequency:

Herceg Novi and Tivat - 103.20 MHz

Budva - 101.70 MHz

External links
Radio Jadran Web Site
Internet Radio Stream

Radio stations in Montenegro